Camargo (Camargu, in Cantabrian) is a municipality in the province and autonomous community of Cantabria, northern Spain. Its capital is Muriedas.

Towns
 Cacicedo.
 Camargo.
 Escobedo.
 Herrera.
 Igollo.
 Maliaño.
 Muriedas (capital).
 Revilla.

References

External links
Ayuntamiento de Camargo
Camargo - Cantabria 102 Municipios

Municipalities in Cantabria